The Bakonybél Abbey is a Benedictine monastery established at Bakonybél in the Kingdom of Hungary in the first decades of the 11th century. Its patron is Saint Maurice.

Foundation (c. 1018–1038)
The establishment of the monastery is connected to the activities of a Thuringian nobleman, Gunther. He entered the Niederaltaich Abbey in order to do penance for his earlier sins, but later became a hermit in the woodlands along the borders between Bavaria and Bohemia. He was related to Gisela of Bavaria, the queen of King Stephen I of Hungary, and often visited them in Hungary. Gunther even lived as hermit in the forests of the Bakony Hills near a royal manor at Veszprém around 1018. Upon his initiative, another saintly man, the Venetian Gerardwho was appointed to educate King Stephen's son, Emericbuilt a chapel at the foot of a nearby hill where he spent seven years of his life as a hermit. Gunther persuaded, in 1037, King Stephen to erect a new chapel dedicated to Saint Maurice, transform his royal manor into a monastery and grant his nearby estates to it.

References

Sources

External links

 Szent Mauríciusz Monostor, Bakonybél

Benedictine monasteries in Hungary
Religious organizations established in the 1010s